The 2006–07 OPJHL season is the 14th season of the Ontario Provincial Junior A Hockey League (OPJHL). The thirty-six teams of the North, South, East, and West divisions will compete in a 49-game schedule.

Come February, the top eight teams of each division competed for the Frank L. Buckland Trophy, the OJHL championship.  The winner of the Buckland Cup, the Aurora Tigers, competed in the Central Canadian Junior "A" championship, the Dudley Hewitt Cup, and won.  Once successful against the winners of the Northern Ontario Junior Hockey League and Superior International Junior Hockey League, the champion Tigers then moved on to play in the Canadian Junior A Hockey League championship, the 2007 Royal Bank Cup where they became national champions.

Changes
Wexford Raiders became Toronto Jr. Canadiens
Oshawa Legionaires became Durham Fury
Couchiching Terriers fold for 2006-07
Toronto Thunderbirds fold for 2006-07
Orangeville Crushers join the OPJHL from the MWJBHL

Final standings
as of February 6, 2008

Note: GP = Games played; W = Wins; L = Losses; OTL = Overtime losses; SL = Shootout losses; GF = Goals for; GA = Goals against; PTS = Points; x = clinched playoff berth; y = clinched division title; z = clinched conference title

Please Note: "x-" implies clinched playoff berth, "zx-" implies clinched division, "wc-" clinched Wild Card, "y-" Eliminated from Playoffs.

Teams listed on the official league website .

Standings listed by Pointstreak on official league website .

2006-07 Frank L. Buckland Trophy Playoffs

Championship round

Divisional Playoffs

East/South

West/North

Note: E is East, S is South, W is West, N is North, WC is Wild Card.

Playoff results are listed by Pointstreak on the official league website .

Dudley Hewitt Cup Championship
Hosted by Abitibi Eskimos in Iroquois Falls, Ontario.  Aurora finished first.

Round Robin
Aurora Tigers 4 - Soo Indians 1
Aurora Tigers 6 - Schreiber Diesels 3
Aurora Tigers 7 - Abitibi Eskimos 0
Final
Aurora Tigers 10 - Schreiber Diesels 0

2007 Royal Bank Cup Championship
Hosted by Prince George Spruce Kings in Prince George, British Columbia. Aurora finished first.

Round Robin
Aurora Tigers 4 - Selkirk Steelers 2
Pembroke Lumber Kings 5 - Aurora Tigers 3
Aurora Tigers 6 - Prince George Spruce Kings 3
Aurora Tigers 7 - Camrose Kodiaks 4
Semi-final
Aurora Tigers 3 - Pembroke Lumber Kings 2 OT
Final
Aurora Tigers 3 - Prince George Spruce Kings 1

Scoring leaders
Note: GP = Games played; G = Goals; A = Assists; Pts = Points; PIM = Penalty minutes

Leading goaltenders
Note: GP = Games played; Mins = Minutes played; W = Wins; L = Losses: OTL = Overtime losses; SL = Shootout losses; GA = Goals Allowed; SO = Shutouts; GAA = Goals against average

Players selected in 2007 NHL Entry Draft
Rd 1 #27	Brendan Smith -	Detroit Red Wings	(St. Michael's Buzzers)
Rd 3 #90	Louie Caporusso -	Ottawa Senators	(St. Michael's Buzzers)
Rd 6 #154	Dan Dunn -		Los Angeles Kings	(Wellington Dukes)
Rd 6 #159	Alain Goulet -	Boston Bruins	(Aurora Tigers)	
Rd 7 #208	Bryan Rufenach -	Detroit Red Wings	(Lindsay Muskies)

See also
 2007 Royal Bank Cup
 Dudley Hewitt Cup
 List of OJHL seasons
 Northern Ontario Junior Hockey League
 Superior International Junior Hockey League
 Greater Ontario Junior Hockey League
 2006 in ice hockey
 2007 in ice hockey

References

External links
 Official website of the Ontario Junior Hockey League
 Official website of the Canadian Junior Hockey League

Ontario Junior Hockey League seasons
OPJHL